Victor L'Episcopo Anfuso (March 10, 1905 – December 28, 1966) was an American lawyer, World War II veteran, and politician who served five terms as a Democratic member of the United States House of Representatives from New York from 1951 to 1953, then again from 1955 to 1963.

Biography
Born in Gagliano Castelferrato, Sicily, the son of Salvatore Anfuso and Mariannina L'Episcopo, he immigrated to the United States in 1914. He attended Columbia University and graduated from Brooklyn Law School in 1927. He married Frances Stallone on June 15, 1930.

Career
Anfuso served in the Office of Strategic Services in the Mediterranean Theatre of World War II from 1943 until 1945. He was elected to Congress in 1950 and served from January 3, 1951, until January 3, 1953. He was city magistrate of Brooklyn from February 1954 until his resignation in July 1954, when he was elected to Congress again and served from January 3, 1955, until January 3, 1963.

Elected to the New York Supreme Court in 1962, Anfuso served in that capacity until his death.

Anfuso appeared in the first segment of To Tell the Truth, March 5, 1957, as an imposter of President Dwight Eisenhower's personal barber, Steve Martini.

Death
Anfuso suffered a heart attack during a meeting at the Warwick Hotel, and died soon after in Manhattan, New York, on December 28, 1966 (age 61 years, 293 days). He is interred at St. John Cemetery, Middle Village, Queens, New York.

References

External links
Victor L. Anfuso Papers at the Center for Migration Studies of New York. 

1905 births
1966 deaths
Italian emigrants to the United States
Politicians from Brooklyn
Brooklyn Law School alumni
Columbia University alumni
People of the Office of Strategic Services
New York Supreme Court Justices
Burials at St. John's Cemetery (Queens)
Democratic Party members of the United States House of Representatives from New York (state)
20th-century American politicians
20th-century American judges
American people of Italian descent
Members of the United States House of Representatives from New York (state)